Raúl Moisés Leguías Ávila (born 9 October 1981) is a football forward who plays for AD Santa Rosa.

Club career
A much-travelled striker or attacking midfielder, Leguías has spent most of his playing career in Panama and Nicaragua but he has also played club football in Guatemala, El Salvador, Angola and Uruguay.

He made his debut with Guatemalan second division side San Pedro in February 2009 only to return to Nicaragua to play for Managua and Real Estelí. In summer 2012 he joined Angolan outfit Onze Bravos, where he scored on his debut and signed for Diriangén a year later.
In January 2014 he arrived in Uruguay to play for Cerro Largo.

Leguías and compatriot Luis Fernando Copete joined Costa Rican side AS Puma for the 2015 Verano season.

Leguias with 107 Goals Scored in 14 Seasons with 8 different teams occupies the 8th position among the top scorers in the history of the Short Tournaments (as of the 2003–04 season) in the Liga Primera de Nicaragua.

International career
Panama-born (and therefore nicknamed Pananica) Leguías changed citizenship made his debut for Nicaragua in a January 2011 Copa Centroamericana match against Panama and has, as of December 2013, earned a total of 13 caps, scoring 3 goals. He has represented his country in 4 FIFA World Cup qualification matches and played at the 2011 and 2013 Copa Centroamericanas.

International goals
Scores and results list Nicaraguas' goal tally first.

Personal life
Leguías is married and has two daughters who reside in Dolores, Carazo Department.

References

External links
 futbolnica.net
 
 

1981 births
Living people
Sportspeople from Colón, Panama
Naturalized citizens of Nicaragua
Nicaraguan people of Panamanian descent
Association football forwards
Panamanian men's footballers
Nicaraguan men's footballers
Nicaragua international footballers
2011 Copa Centroamericana players
2013 Copa Centroamericana players
Sporting San Miguelito players
C.D. Plaza Amador players
Tauro F.C. players
C.D. Árabe Unido players
Deportivo Colonia players
Platense F.C. players
Diriangén FC players
Real Estelí F.C. players
Managua F.C. players
Cerro Largo F.C. players
C.D. Walter Ferretti players
F.C. Bravos do Maquis players
Panamanian expatriate footballers
Panamanian expatriate sportspeople in Uruguay
Expatriate footballers in Uruguay
Panamanian expatriate sportspeople in El Salvador
Expatriate footballers in El Salvador
Panamanian expatriate sportspeople in Guatemala
Expatriate footballers in Guatemala
Panamanian expatriate sportspeople in Angola
Expatriate footballers in Angola
Panamanian expatriate sportspeople in Costa Rica
Expatriate footballers in Costa Rica
Liga Panameña de Fútbol players